Heterosphecia is a genus of moths in the family Sesiidae which is found from Borneo, Sumatra and South India. There are eight known species with few records, so consequently their conservation status is unknown.

Species
Heterosphecia bantanakai (Arita & Gorbunov, 2000)
Heterosphecia hyaloptera (Hampson, 1919)
Heterosphecia indica Kallies, 2003
Heterosphecia melissoides (Hampson, [1893])
Heterosphecia robinsoni Kallies, 2003
Heterosphecia soljanikovi (Gorbunov, 1988)
Heterosphecia tawonoides Kallies, 2003

References

Sesiidae